The Sultan's Armed Forces Museum is a military history museum, located in the 150-year-old Bait Al Falaj Fort, once the headquarters for Sultan Said bin Sultan's Armed Forces, located on Al Mujamma Street, in the Ruwi area near Muscat, Oman. It was graciously inaugurated in 1988 by His Majesty Sultan Qaboos, who was supreme commander of the Armed Forces until his death in 2020. 

The museum has an extensive collection related to Oman's military history, national conflicts; with displays of weapons (such as guns and cannons), service uniforms, an external display of military vehicles, military music instruments, medals and even a jet aircraft ejection seat and a parachute on display.

Introduction 
The royal gesture to designate Bait-Al-Falaj Fort to house the Sultan's Armed Forces Museum means the opening of a new page in the record of Omani mighty military power and the documentation of a new era in its modern development being the only heir of the triumphant glories of the Omani military. The museum is meant to tell the forthcoming generations the story of the progressive development that Sultan's Armed Forces has achieved by the powerful hands and sacrifices of the Omani during the renaissance era under the leadership of His Majesty Sultan Qaboos Bin Said, the reviver of the glories of Oman and the leader of its blessed renaissance.

References

1992 establishments in Oman
Museums established in 1992
History museums in Oman
Museums in Muscat, Oman
Army museums in Asia